Masi may refer to:

Places
 Masi, Almora, a small town located in the west Ramgang valley of Almora in India
 Masi, Veneto, a city in the province of Padua in northern Italy
 Masi, Norway, a village in Finnmark county in northern Norway

Other uses
 Maasi, sister of one's mother, in Indian, Pakistani culture.
 Masi (surname)
 Masi (food), a Filipino dessert made from rice flour balls with a peanut filling
 Masi Oka, actor, star of TV show Heroes
 Masi Bicycles, a bicycle manufacturer
 Masi (Fiji), the Fijian term for the Paper Mulberry tree
The Fijian name for Tapa cloth, made from the bark of the Paper Mulberry
 The Sisu SA-150, a Finnish military truck colloquially known as Maasto-Sisu or Masi for short.
 Masi or Māci, a month in the Tamil calendar corresponding to mid-February to mid-March
 Masi (india ink), an archaic (and the indian) term for Indian ink

MASI may refer to:

 MASI, Movement of Asylum Seekers in Ireland
 MASI index, (acronym for Moroccan All Shares Index), a Casablanca Stock Exchange index

See also 
 Maasi, a village in Estonia